Phosphatidylinositol 3-kinase catalytic subunit type 3 is an enzyme subunit that in humans is encoded by the PIK3C3 gene. It's a class III  phosphoinositide 3-kinase.

References

Further reading